Larambha College is situated in the Larambha village of Bargarh district in Odisha, India.

The college is established by honourable Dr. Brajamohan Panda in the year 1956. The college is located at a distance of 0.75 km from State highway of Godbhaga-Sonepur that joins National Highway No 6 at Godbhaga which is 7.5 km away from Larambha.

Originally a science college, the college now offers courses in humanities, Physics, Chemistry, Zoology, Botany, Mathematics, Economics, Political science, History and Oriya language. It also houses a higher secondary section.

The college has NCC and NSS (National Service Scheme) sections. Hostel facilities are available for residential both male and female students. A well furnished play ground is also there.

The college has been accredited as B+ by National Assessment and Accreditation Council (NAAC). It has also been awarded Prakruti Mitra award by the State Government of Odisha.

External links 
 Official website

Universities and colleges in Odisha
Bargarh district
Educational institutions established in 1964
1964 establishments in Orissa